The Lucienne Nielsen House is a historic house in Nokomis, Florida, United States. It was designed by Ralph Twitchell for his wife and was built in 1956 in a Sarasota School of Architecture style featuring expansive views of its surroundings. It is located at 3730 Sandspur Lane. On March 21, 2007, it was added to the U.S. National Register of Historic Places.

References

Houses on the National Register of Historic Places in Sarasota County, Florida
Houses completed in 1956